Adrienn Kocsis de Carulla (born 14 May 1973) is a retired Peruvian badminton player who initially played for Hungary but later moved on to represent Perú. Kocsis won Hungarian national championship and Peruvian national championship many times. Most notably, she won two bronze medals at 1999 Pan American games in Canada in two disciplines while representing Perú. She's the winner of several international titles in Italy, Peru, Brazil, Argentina and Chile. She also finished runner-up in Slovenia, Spain, Suriname and Jamaican international tournaments.

Achievements

Pan American Games

IBF International

References 

1973 births
Living people
Peruvian female badminton players
Hungarian female badminton players
Pan American Games bronze medalists for Peru
Pan American Games medalists in badminton
Badminton players at the 1999 Pan American Games
Medalists at the 1999 Pan American Games
Sportspeople from Debrecen
20th-century Peruvian women